"The Cartridge Family" is the fifth episode of the ninth season of the American animated television series The Simpsons. It originally aired on the Fox network in the United States on November 2, 1997. It was written by John Swartzwelder and directed by Pete Michels. In the episode, Homer purchases a gun to protect his family, of which Marge disapproves. Homer begins to show extremely careless gun usage causing Marge to leave him when she catches Bart using the gun without their permission. The episode was intended to show guns in a neutral way, and faced some problems with the censors because of the subject matter. Critical reaction was mostly positive.

Plot
A soccer riot breaks out in Springfield after a boring match between Mexico and Portugal. Fearing for her family's safety, Marge tells Homer to buy a Home Security System, but after learning it would cost $500, he buys a handgun instead. After a five-day waiting period per the Brady Act, Homer shows his firearm to Marge, who is horrified and demands he get rid of it. Homer brings her to a local National Rifle Association meeting hoping to change her mind, but she remains unconvinced.

After a near accident at the dinner table, Marge again begs Homer to get rid of the gun. He promises to, but later, Bart and Milhouse find it in the refrigerator's vegetable crisper. Marge discovers this and berates Homer, then leaves with the children and checks into a motel. That night, Homer hosts an NRA meeting at his house, but the other members kick him out of the association after seeing how recklessly he uses his pistol. Realizing what his behavior has cost him, Homer goes to the motel and tells Marge he got rid of the gun.

While leaving, Snake arrives to rob the desk clerk. Homer pulls out his gun and Marge is angry he lied again, but as he tries to apologize, Snake snatches the gun. The other NRA members arrive, but fail to prevent Snake escaping with the contents of the cash drawer. Homer then says he does not trust himself and asks Marge to throw the gun away herself. However, Marge sees a reflection of herself holding it in the trash can and decides to keep it for herself.

Production

This was the first episode to air which was executive produced by Mike Scully. Sam Simon pitched an episode for one of the first seasons which saw Homer getting a gun and nobody wanting him to have it. That episode would have concluded with Homer foiling a robbery and stating that although guns bring destruction, it worked for him. However, this episode was pitched by Scully for either season seven or eight, before being used for season nine. This provided the basic outline, and John Swartzwelder wrote the script. A lot of lines in the episode put guns in a positive light, as the staff felt that they could not just make an episode about how bad they were. Several of the staff, including Swartzwelder, are "pro gun", although others, such as Matt Groening, are completely against them. The episode was designed to be non-biased and to portray each side of the argument equally. Scully noted that if there is any message in the episode it is that a man like Homer should not own a gun. The Fox Network censors were nervous about some of the episode's subject matter, such as Homer pointing the gun in Marge's face, and Bart aiming the gun at Milhouse with the apple in his mouth, but ultimately let it go.

The opening sequence where soccer is portrayed as the most boring sport imaginable was intended to show that soccer was more boring on television than live, but both Michels and Groening enjoy the game. The referee at the game is a caricature of the janitor at Film Roman, who supplied director Pete Michels with every piece of soccer information he needed to design the episode. Pelé also makes an appearance at the match, although he is voiced by Hank Azaria.

The episode closes with music from the 1960s spy series The Avengers. After the music had been recorded, Scully felt that it did not suit the ending. However, it was too late in production to get the full orchestra back to make a new recording, and union rules meant that previous recordings could not be reused.

Cultural references
The chalkboard gag references the Richard Gere gerbil urban legend.

The gun shop is based on the shop that the Los Angeles Police Department went to during the North Hollywood bank robbery to acquire more ammunition. 
The title of this episode is a play on the name of 1970s television series The Partridge Family. The end music is the theme to the 1960s British TV series The Avengers, and the song playing when Homer is sitting and watching things go by while he is waiting five days for his gun is "The Waiting" by Tom Petty and the Heartbreakers. Petty rarely let his music be used on television, but, being a fan of The Simpsons, he allowed them to use it.

Reception
In its original broadcast, "The Cartridge Family" finished 26th in ratings for the week of October 27 – November 2, 1997, with a Nielsen rating of 10.5, equivalent to approximately 10.3 million viewing households. It was the third highest-rated show on the Fox network, following The X-Files and King of the Hill.

The episode received several positive reviews, being included in the Herald Sun's list of the top twenty The Simpsons episodes. It was also named the fifth best episode in the show's history in an article by The Florida Times-Union. The Pittsburgh Post-Gazette also praised the episode, calling The Simpsons "the only sitcom in memory to treat gun control with any fairness".

On the other hand, the episode has been criticized by several outlets. Although the fictionalized NRA stresses the importance of responsible gun ownership, the staff nonetheless received several complaints from the real National Rifle Association about the portrayal of the organization in the episode. Ian Jones and Steve Williams criticized the episode, calling it "a messy, unfocused lampooning of gun culture". Warren Martyn and Adrian Wood, the authors of the book I Can't Believe It's a Bigger and Better Updated Unofficial Simpsons Guide, found that it was "one of the most politically unambiguous episodes ever", but that "[it] is very dull and the plot isn't sustainable". Anna Leszkiewicz in the New Statesman later pinpointed it as the moment Marge should have left Homer, saying "Homer has proved himself to be a violent, unstable, controlling, reckless husband".

The episode was not initially aired on the United Kingdom satellite channel Sky1 due to scenes of flagrant gun misuse, yet was aired several times on BBC Two in an earlier evening timeslot.
The episode has since been aired in daytime slots on all channels which have broadcast The Simpsons in the UK, albeit with partial editing.

The episode was included on a 1999 UK VHS release titled "The Simpsons: Too Hot for TV", which included several other episodes that were deemed to be too raunchy for airing on television. A DVD of the same title was released in 2003.

References

External links

The Simpsons (season 9) episodes
1997 American television episodes
Television shows written by John Swartzwelder
Television episodes pulled from general rotation
Animation controversies in television
Obscenity controversies in animation
Obscenity controversies in television
Television controversies in the United Kingdom
Cultural depictions of Pelé